Kamil Kryński (born 12 May 1987) is a Polish sprinter who specializes in the 200 metres. His biggest success to date is finishing 4th in the 4 x 100 metres relay final at the 2011 World Championships in Daegu, South Korea.

Competition record

Personal bests
Outdoor
 100m – 10.33 (2012)
 200m – 20.56 (2012)
 400m – 47.68 (2008)

Indoor
 60m – 6.69 (2011)
 200m – 21.11 (2013)

References

External links

 
 http://vincovitanj.tripod.com/podlasie (Under Construction)

1987 births
Living people
Polish male sprinters
Athletes (track and field) at the 2012 Summer Olympics
Olympic athletes of Poland
Universiade medalists in athletics (track and field)
Sportspeople from Białystok
Podlasie Białystok athletes
Universiade silver medalists for Poland
Universiade bronze medalists for Poland
Medalists at the 2013 Summer Universiade
Medalists at the 2015 Summer Universiade
21st-century Polish people